Eddie Rocket's is an Irish restaurant chain, with its headquarters in Dublin. It offers American-style food in 1950s' style diners (similar to the Johnny Rockets diner restaurants in the United States). It is owned by Rocket Restaurants Limited.

Company 
Rocket Restaurants Limited opened their first restaurant in Dublin in 1989 and at one point were present in 42 locations in Ireland (both in the Republic of Ireland and Northern Ireland), England, Wales, and Spain. The company still has a substantial franchisee base. The Spanish site has since closed. They also have a number of restaurants branded Rocket's by Eddie Rocket's these restaurants are smaller fast casual restaurants which feature self service instead of table service which is the norm in Eddie Rockets locations and have a more modern decor similar to that found in chains such as Five Guys and Shake Shack.

Franchise 
Eddie Rocket's restaurants are largely franchised, with 32 of the 40 restaurants held by franchisees. It is a member of the Irish Franchise Association.

Locations

There are currently 38 restaurants in operation in Ireland including:

 Arklow
 Athlone
 Bray
 Carlow
 Dublin
 Drogheda
 Killarney
 Mullingar
 Naas
 Navan
 Newbridge
 Newry 
 Portlaoise
 Tullamore

Shake Dog / Rockin' Joe's 
A number of Eddie Rocket's restaurants in Cork, Galway, Limerick, Waterford, Wexford, Drogheda and Clonmel were rebranded as Rockin' Joe's in 2013 following a dispute between Eddie Rocket's and its largest franchisee, Limerick businessman Brian Dunne. Rockin' Joe's later rebranded as Shake Dog.

See also

 Ed's Easy Diner
 Johnny Rockets
 List of hamburger restaurants

References

External links
 Eddie Rocket's

Restaurants established in 1989
Fast-food chains of Ireland
Restaurants in the Republic of Ireland